Osvald Almqvist (1884–1950) was a Swedish architect, who was one of the pioneers of functionalism in Swedish architecture. His designs include those for hydro-electric power stations at Forshuvudfors (1917–21), Hammarfors (1925-28) and Krångfors (1925–28). Between 1939 and 1938, Almqvist was in charge of the Stockholm Parks Department.

References

1884 births
1950 deaths
Swedish architects
Functionalist architects
KTH Royal Institute of Technology alumni